Voganj railway station is a railway station on Belgrade–Šid railway. Located in Voganj, Ruma, Serbia. Railroad continued to Sremska Mitrovica in one and the other direction to Ruma. Voganj railway station consists of 5 railway track.

See also 
 Serbian Railways

References 

Ruma
Railway stations in Vojvodina